María Salerno is a Spanish film and television actress. In the early years of her career she was credited as Marta Monterrey.

Selected filmography
 More Dollars for the MacGregors (1970)
 Reverend's Colt (1970)
 Naked Therapy (1975)
 Inquisition (1976)
 The Legion Like Women (1976)
 Hooray for Divorce! (1982)
 The Secret Nights of Lucrezia Borgia (1982)
 Invierno en Marbella (1983)
 El misterio de Cynthia Baird (1985)

References

Bibliography
 Luis Gasca. Un siglo de cine español. Planeta, 1998.

External links

1948 births
Living people
Spanish film actresses
Spanish stage actresses
Spanish television actresses
20th-century Spanish actresses